Generations in Song is a studio album by American country singer–songwriter Hank Locklin. It was originally released in 2001 on the Coldwater label and re-released in 2006 on the Slewfoot label. The album originally contained 19 tracks of solo cuts and duets with fellow country artists, including Dolly Parton, Vince Gill and Jeannie Seely. It was Locklin's first album in many years and was the twenty eighth studio project of his career. The album received positive reviews from critics following its release.

Background
Hank Locklin had his greatest commercial success during the 1950s and 1960s with several well-known songs like "Send Me the Pillow You Dream On," "Geisha Girl" and "Please Help Me, I'm Falling." The songs became major hits on the country charts after being released as singles and made Locklin internationally successful. After leaving his long-time record label, Locklin recorded for several small labels during the 1970s. In the decades that followed, Locklin took a recording hiatus, mostly due to a blood cell disease that forced him to receive regular transfusions. His son, Hank Adam Locklin, coaxed his father to return to the recording studio. Originally, Generations in Song was planned to be sold on television, however the plan did not materialize. Instead, the Locklin's bought out the album and recorded it themselves.

Content and recording
Generations in Song was a collection of 12 duets recorded with fellow country artists. Among the artists chosen was Vince Gill, who performed "Danny Boy" alongside Locklin in a tenor harmony. Dolly Parton performed with Locklin on a remake of his hit "Send Me the Pillow That You Dream On". Also featured performing duets alongside Locklin are fellow country performers Jan Howard, Jeanne Pruett, Jeannie Seely and Hank Adam Locklin. The album's material is mostly cover versions of previously-recorded country songs, such as "Hey Good Lookin'" and "Almost Persuaded." The album itself was produced by Hank Adam Locklin at the Legends Studio, located in Nashville, Tennessee. To help revive the "classic" sound found on Locklin's early records, session musicians from his original 1960s LP's were chosen for the project. This included Hargus "Pig" Robbins on piano and Harold Bradley on guitar.

Release and critical reception

Generations in Song was first released on Coldwater Records in 2001. It was originally offered as a compact disc and contained 19 tracks in its original release. On February 10, 2004, the album was re-released on Slewfoot Records in a compact disc format again. However, only 12 tracks were included on the re-release. The album cover was also changed for the re-release of the project. Locklin and his son bought advertisement time on the Grand Ole Opry to help promote the record, making him the first country artist to do so.

The project received positive reviews from critics following its release. Bruce Eder of AllMusic gave Generations in Song a four-star rating in his review, calling it a "killer album". Eder was impressed by Locklin's youthful-sounding voice, commenting, "His voice sounds at least three decades fresher than it has a right to, and the harmonizing and the playing are first-rate, along with the arrangements, which makes this more than an exercise in nostalgia." Tom Netherland had a similar observation in his review of the album for Country Standard Time. "Locklin's 83 years old and still singing in the same keys he did 50 years ago, back when he was first gaining national notice," he stated.

Meanwhile, No Depression praised the album for its duet partnerships, calling Dolly Parton's harmony "charming". The magazine concluded by discussing the album's liner notes: "In the liner notes, he writes, 'Sing along if you want to, ’cause the louder you sing, the better I’ll sound!' Given the caliber of the artist and the musicians, that seems unlikely."

Track listing

Original release

Re-release

Personnel
All credits are adapted from the liner notes of Generations in Song and AllMusic.

Musical personnel

 Harold Bradley – Guitar
 Jimmy Capps – Guitar
 Vinnie Ciesielski – Horn
 Charlie Cushman – Banjo
 Vince Gill – Guest artist
 Buddy Harman – Drums, percussion
 Herbert Hester – Fiddle, Mandolin, Rhythm guitar
 Jan Howard – Guest artist
 The Carol Lee Singers – Background vocals
 Billy Linneman – Upright bass
 Brandt Locklin – Guest Artist
 Hank Adam Locklin – Guest artist
 Hank Locklin – Lead vocals
 Charlie McCoy – Harmonica
 Weldon Myrick – Steel guitar
 Dolly Parton – Guest artist
 Jeanne Pruett – Guest artist
 Leon Rhodes – Bass, rhythm guitar
 Hargus "Pig" Robbins – Piano

Technical personnel
 Lou Bradley – Engineer
 Hollis Flatt – Mastering
 Merle Haggard – Quotes researched and compiled
 Hank Adam Locklin – Producer
 Jimmy Nichols – Arrangement

Release history

References

2001 albums
Hank Locklin albums